Boots Malone is a 1952 American drama film directed by William Dieterle. It stars William Holden as a down-on-his-luck sports agent and Johnny Stewart as a rich runaway who wants to become a jockey.

Plot
Down on his luck, jockey agent "Boots" Malone is at a diner with his friend "Stash" Clements when teenage runaway Thomas Gibson Jr. tries to pay for his meal with a hundred dollar bill. When the cook asks him to come back in the morning for his change, Boots steps in (the diner is a portable trailer and will be somewhere else by that time). Interested in the money himself, Boots takes the boy under his wing. Tommy is eager to become a jockey, so he offers to pay Boots to train him. He is soon doing various chores around the stables.

Meanwhile, Boots, Stash, and "Preacher" Cole have their eye on a promising horse, White Cargo. They fix it so that it performs badly at its next workout. As a result, owner Howard Whitehead puts it up for auction. When another bidder offers more than they have, Tommy produces another hundred dollar bill, and they have their horse.

One day, White Cargo is startled and bolts with Tommy on his back, showing that the boy has some talent. Boots begins to really train him. He lets the lad ride in a race, but does not tell him that they have secretly weighed White Cargo down (so they can get better odds for their bets in a later race). The horse does poorly in the race, upsetting the boy. To restore Tommy's confidence, Boots has him ride in another race with a different horse; he wins.

As the big race approaches, complications arise. Boots tangles with a private detective hired by Tommy's mother, a wealthy businesswoman, to find her boy. Boots reluctantly calls her and tells her where to collect her son. Disapproving of Boots, she convinces Tommy that Boots turned him in for the $5000 reward. (Later, she refuses to pay Boots.) Despite this, Tommy runs away again and returns to Boots in time for the race. The two reconcile. When Mrs. Gibson calls, Boots warns her that she will lose the love of her son if she prevents him from racing.

Meanwhile, Matson, a gangster to whom Boots owes a lot of money, tells him to throw the race, as he has bet heavily on another horse. Boots tries to convince Tommy to go along, but in the end, does not have the heart to spoil what may be the boy's last ride, and White Cargo wins. Afterwards, Tommy boards a train to go back to school. When Boots is warned that Matson and his men are waiting for him, he jumps on the train.

Cast

William Holden as "Boots" Malone
Johnny Stewart as Thomas Gibson Jr.
Stanley Clements as "Stash" Clements
Basil Ruysdael as "Preacher" Cole
Carl Benton Reid as John Williams
Ralph Dumke as Beckett, Whitehead's adviser
Ed Begley as Howard Whitehead, a wealthy, but inexperienced horse owner
Hugh Sanders as Matson
Harry Morgan as "Quarter Horse" Henry (as Henry Morgan)
Ann Lee as Mrs. Gibson
Anthony Caruso as Joe
Billy Pearson as Eddie Koch, a rival jockey. Pearson was a real-life thoroughbred jockey.
Emory Parnell as Evans (uncredited)

References

External links

1952 films
1952 drama films
American drama films
American black-and-white films
Films directed by William Dieterle
Films about gambling
American horse racing films
Columbia Pictures films
1950s English-language films
1950s American films
English-language drama films